Angelo Jacobini (25 April 1825 – 3 March 1886) was an Italian prelate of the Catholic Church who spent his entire career in the Roman Curia. He was made a cardinal in 1882.

Biography
Angelo Maria Jacobini was born in Genzano on 25 April 1825.  He was a cousin of Luigi Jacobini, who was made a cardinal in 1879.

He studied at the seminary in Albano and then at the Sapienza University of Rome. The date of his priestly ordination is unknown. He was never consecrated a bishop. He obtained a doctorate in theology in 1846. He also studied canon and civil law. He then held a series of positions in the Roman Curia, beginning as auditor of the Congregation of the Council.

From 1867 to 1869, he worked in the preparatory commission of the First Vatican Council and from 1869 to 1870 was assistant to the undersecretary of that Council.

In 1873, he gave testimony in Ireland in a lawsuit for defamation brought by a parish priest against Cardinal Paul Cullen, Archbishop of Dublin; he contributed to Cullen's successful defense of his suspension of the priest.

He was appointed secretary of the Congregation of Extraordinary Ecclesiastical Affairs on 3 October 1875. He was named assessor of the Congregation of the Inquisition on 15 March 1877.

Pope Leo XIII made him a cardinal deacon on 27 March 1882; he was assigned the deaconry of San Eustachio. To avoid confusion with his cousin Cardinal Luigi Jacobini's coat of arms, which used the Jacobini family's coat of arms, he added elements from his mother's family.

He died in Rome on 3 March 1886.

References

External links
 

1825 births
1886 deaths
People from Genzano di Roma
Officials of the Roman Curia
Diplomats of the Holy See
Cardinals created by Pope Leo XIII